Denys Andriyovych Miroshnichenko (born 11 October 1994) is a Ukrainian professional football defender who currently plays for Oleksandriya in the Ukrainian Premier League.

Club career
Miroshnichenko is a product of Kryvbas Kryvyi Rih academy. He made his debut for Kryvbas Kryvyi Rih coming in as a second-half substitute against Dynamo Kyiv on 3 March 2013 in the Ukrainian Premier League.

References

External links
 
 

1994 births
Living people
Sportspeople from Kryvyi Rih
Ukrainian footballers
Association football midfielders
FC Kryvbas Kryvyi Rih players
FC Dnipro players
FC Karpaty Lviv players
FC Oleksandriya players
Ukrainian Premier League players
Ukraine youth international footballers
Ukraine under-21 international footballers